Ana Teresa Casas Bonilla (born 8 November 1991) is a Mexican racing cyclist, who rides for American amateur team CWA Racing p/b Goldman Sachs ETFs. She competed in the 2013 UCI women's time trial and 2013 UCI women's road race in Florence.

Personal life
Casas is married to fellow cyclist, Ignacio Prado.

Major results

2010
 2nd Road race, National Road Championships
2011
 2nd Road race, National Road Championships
 4th Road race, Pan American Games
2012
 2nd Time trial, National Road Championships
 Pan American Road Championships
9th Time trial
10th Road race
2013
 National Road Championships
2nd Road race
3rd Time trial
 6th Road race, Pan American Road Championships
 9th Overall Vuelta Internacional Femenina a Costa Rica
2014
 National Road Championships
1st  Road race
2nd Time trial
 8th Time trial, Pan American Road Championships
2015
 3rd Time trial, National Road Championships
 3rd Overall Vuelta Internacional Femenina a Costa Rica
1st Stage 2
2016
 10th Gran Prix San Luis Femenino
2018
 2nd  Team pursuit, Pan American Track Championships
2020
 2nd Road race, National Road Championships

References

External links

1991 births
Living people
Mexican female cyclists
Sportspeople from Mexico City
21st-century Mexican women
20th-century Mexican women
Competitors at the 2018 Central American and Caribbean Games